Wei Mei-hui (born 18 August 1963) is a Taiwanese retired para table tennis player. She has won three medals from the 2000 Summer Paralympics and 2004 Summer Paralympics.

Wei is a polio survivor. She has a twin sister who is not disabled. She began playing table tennis in 1990.

References 

1963 births
Living people
Table tennis players at the 2000 Summer Paralympics
Table tennis players at the 2004 Summer Paralympics
Table tennis players at the 2008 Summer Paralympics
Table tennis players at the 2012 Summer Paralympics
Table tennis players at the 2016 Summer Paralympics
Medalists at the 2000 Summer Paralympics
Medalists at the 2004 Summer Paralympics
Sportspeople from Taichung
Paralympic medalists in table tennis
Taiwanese female table tennis players
Taiwanese twins
Paralympic silver medalists for Chinese Taipei
Paralympic bronze medalists for Chinese Taipei
Paralympic table tennis players of Chinese Taipei
People with polio
Twin sportspeople
21st-century Taiwanese women